Shivaree was an Americana band formed in 1997, consisting of Ambrosia Parsley (vocals), Danny McGough (keyboard), and Duke McVinnie (guitar). Shivaree is best known for the song "Goodnight Moon", released in 1999, heard in Dawson's Creek, Kill Bill: Volume 2, and Silver Linings Playbook. Shivaree officially disbanded in 2007 after a very brief promotional tour of its last album, Tainted Love.

History
The band takes its name from the Cajun term "shivaree", which means, roughly, a noisy mock serenade for newlyweds. It is most commonly used along and to the west of the Mississippi River.

They have produced four full-length albums, one of which was not released in North America due to contract disagreements, with approximately 500,000 sales in total.. Shivaree credits many other musicians in its work and is usually joined by two or three collaborators when performing live. The band has mentioned its use of primarily Southern American ideas and themes, citing William Faulkner as an influence. After contract disagreements with its previous label, the group appeared about to split up after its second album. However, an EP and another two albums followed.

Shivaree's best known song, "Goodnight Moon", was featured in Seasons 3 and 6 of the television series, Dawson's Creek; in the American film, Silver Linings Playbook; in the closing credits of the Quentin Tarantino film, Kill Bill: Volume 2; in the closing scenes and end credits of the French comedy-drama, Ni reprise ni échangée (English title, Monique); and in a commercial for the Norwegian clothing shop, Cubus.  The song "Little Black Mess" was heard in the Weeds episode "Only Judy Can Judge."

During a ten-year musical career, the band released four full-length albums, two EPs, and eight singles, some of which included unreleased songs.

Band members
Shivaree's band members were vocalist Ambrosia Parsley, keyboardist Danny McGough, and guitarist Duke McVinnie. Parsley was to have released a solo debut album in the spring of 2011. McGough and McVinnie continue to work independently with other artists as session musicians and producers.

Discography

Albums
 I Oughtta Give You a Shot in the Head for Making Me Live in This Dump (Oct 19, 1999)
 Rough Dreams (Jun 17, 2002) – not released in USA due to disagreements with record label.
 Who's Got Trouble? (Jan 11, 2005)
 Tainted Love: Mating Calls and Fight Songs (Jul 31, 2007) – album of covers

EPs
 Corrupt and Immoral Transmissions (EP – 2000)
 Breach (EP – 2004)

Singles
 "Goodnight Moon" (1999 & 2000) MV
 "Bossa Nova" (2001) MV
 "John 2/14" (2002) MV
 "After The Prince And The Showgirl" (2002)
 "Rough Dreams (promo)" (2002) French two-track bonus promo CD with "Goodnight Moon (Live au Théatre des Variétés)" and "Great Balls of Fire"
 "I Close My Eyes" (2005) MV
 "New Casablanca" (2005) MV – radio promo CDR only, no official single release.
 "2 Far" (2005) – remake of "Gone too Far" from their previous album "Rough Dreams".
 "Cold Blooded" (2007)
MV indicates that a music video was made for the song as part of promotion.

Non-album studio recordings and alternate versions
 "Scrub" and "My Boy Lollipop" – were released on the "Goodnight Moon" Maxi single in 1999 and then again on the Corrupt and Immoral Transmissions EP in 2000.
 "Funeral Song for a Dog" – was released only once on the "Bossa Nova" maxi single in 2001.
 "You Don't Know What Love Is" – was recorded during Shivaree's debut album but never released. A 55-second clip was available in an EPK posted in October 2010 on Ambrosia's official Facebook page.
 "The Snake" – was released only once on the "John 2/14" maxi single in 2002.
 "Great Balls of Fire" – was released in 2002 as track two of a rare French "Rough Dreams" promo CD.
 "Bossa Nova (Allskate Mix)" – was released only once, on the "Bossa Nova" single in 2001 and was the mix used in the music video instead of the album version.
 "Bossa Nova (Album Edit)" – was released on the "Bossa Nova" single in 2001. It's similar to the version on I Oughtta Give You a Shot in the Head..., but with an alternate ending. Although titled "(Album Edit)," it's not the same track.
 "I Close My Eyes (Breach Edit)" – was released on the Breach EP in 2004 and on the one-track single of the same title. Almost identical to the album version, but with a slight difference in instrumentation and with an extended ending.
 "I Close My Eyes (Radio Mix)" and "(TV Track)" – were never officially released. These mixes only appear on a very rare two-track radio promo single.

Official Live released tracks
 "Goodnight Moon" (Live) – was released only once in the "Corrupt and Immoral Transmissions" EP in 2000.
 "I Don't Care" (Live) – was released in the "Corrupt and Immoral Transmissions" EP in 2000 and then again in the "Bossa Nova" single in 2001.

Live covers and live unreleased songs
 "Stroll" (Live) – was NEVER released on CD. It is only a live performance at Le Ciel in Grenoble, France on April 25, 2005. This song was released by Ambrosia Parsley in her 2013 solo album "Weeping Cherry" but was titled "Skin and Bones".
 Great Balls of Fire (Live) – was an unofficial promo release of "The Black Sessions 2002" (The Black Sessions are performances of the live music broadcast on the French Radio station ‘France Inter‘. These are recorded in front of a live audience and featured on a C‘est Lenoir show. A French Radio DJ's name is Bernard Lenoir [“Lenoir“ means “black“ in English]). This was released in a CD of only 2500 copies to local radio stations and shops in North America and Europe. Only 2,500 copies were made of this CD.
 "Tonight You Belong To Me" (Live) – was an unofficial promo release of "The Black Sessions 2002".   This was released in a CD of only 2500 copies to local radio stations and shops in North America and Europe.
 "Get Out And Get Under The Moon" (Live) – was NEVER released on CD. It is only a live performance at Le Ciel in Grenoble, France on April 25, 2005.
 "Heaven" (Live) – Duo with Nada Surf for the emission on "Musicplanet2nite"
in Arte on 03.10.2002 but was NEVER released on CD.

 "Dedicated Follower Of Fashion" (Live) – a cover of 'The Kinks' performed in OuiFm radio(AcousticSession+Interview in Paris) March 25, 2005. was never released.
 "Hold Me Right" (live) – only performed on tour but never released.

References

External links
 Official site by Zoe Records
 Shivaree (fan made) Forum

American alternative country groups
Americana music groups
Capitol Records artists
American musical trios
Musical groups established in 1997
Musical groups disestablished in 2007
Zoë Records artists